Andrew Burton is a snowboarder.

Andrew or Andy Burton may also refer to:

Andy Burton (footballer) (1884–?), Scottish footballer
Andy Burton (politician) (born 1942), Canadian politician
Andy Burton (TV presenter), sports reporter and commentator

See also
Burton (name)